Mahaan is a 2022 Indian Tamil-language action thriller film written and directed by Karthik Subbaraj and produced by S. S. Lalit Kumar under the banner of Seven Screen Studio. The film stars Vikram, Simran, Dhruv Vikram, Bobby Simha, while Sananth, Vettai Muthukumar, Deepak Paramesh and Aadukalam Naren in supporting roles. The plot revolves around the journey of a commerce teacher named Gandhi Mahaan and his son Dadabhai Naoroji, as the former turns into a liquor baron and lives a life of his own after being abandoned by his family and the latter, an extremist Gandhian vows revenge on his father who violated Gandhian principles and abandoned his family. 

The film's music is composed by Santhosh Narayanan, with cinematography handled by Shreyaas Krishna and editing done by Vivek Harshan. Principal Photography of the film began on 10 March 2021. After some days the filming was stopped due to COVID-19 restrictions and then was resumed on 6 July. The shooting of the film was completed on 14 August. Owing to the delays of the film, due to the COVID-19 pandemic, a few incomplete scenes were cut from the final runtime of 3 hours, which were later released on the 100th day of release. The film was released on 10 February 2022 on Amazon Prime Video to critical acclaim from critics and audience, with praise directed towards the cast's performances (particularly Vikram, Dhruv, Simha and Sananth), Subbaraj's direction, storyline, music, cinematography, action sequences and production values.

Plot 
1968: Mohandoss is a middle-aged liquor-ban activist whose son Gandhi Mahaan is the exact opposite of him, and is addicted to gambling and drinking. Sathyavan Soosaiyappan is his friend, who gambles against Gnanodhayam. Gandhi is a prodigy in gambling and always helps Sathya win matches. One time, Sathya keeps on losing and confronts Gandhi, who tells that he has no choice but to make him lose because Gnanam kidnapped his dog, Joker. Everyone fights over it, and their parents had to interfere in it. Mohandoss makes Gandhi promise that he will lead the liquor ban movement and live as a Mahaan.

1996: Gandhi is a 40-year-old commerce teacher at the local government school. He is married to Nachi and has a son Dada. On his birthday, Gandhi leaves for a temple where he meets a beggar, who tells that Gandhi leads a life like 95% of people with morals or principals, but cannot lead a life like 5% of people, who do not follow morals or principles in life. At night, Gandhi remembers the beggar's words where Nachi tells Gandhi that she and her friends are going on a trip to Tirupati. Gandhi uses this as an opportunity to live life to the fullest and goes to a bar, where he meets one of his old students, Rakesh Christopher alias Rocky, who decides to help Gandhi fulfill his dreams. 

Gandhi is then taken to Rocky's father Sathya, where Gandhi plays rummy and wins a lot of money. Sathya recognizes Gandhi as his childhood friend due to the scar. The next morning, Gandhi reaches back home, where Nachi deduces that Gandhi is in a drunken state and leaves him, taking Dada with her, since Gandhi broke the rule of never drinking. Gandhi goes to Nachi's house to try a reconciliation, but is ousted where he decides to live with Sathya and Rocky, and they all come up with selling the liquor that Sathya's father Soosaiyappan made and names the brand as Sooraa.

1998: Gandhi, Sathya and Rocky are all rich from selling the liquor and plan to start a syndicate where only their drink could be sold in the bars in Tamil Nadu. One of the members opposes and attacks them, but Gandhi fights all of them off. This incident causes Sathya to get paranoid and suggests that they stop selling liquor.

2003: Gandhi, Sathya and Rocky have become influential people in society. However, The Tamil Nadu Government announces that only approved liquor is allowed to be sold in bars, and with this development, they decide to visit one of the party members, Gnanam, whom they then deduce that he is also one of their childhood friends and agree to a deal that Sooraa can be sold in bars.

2016: The gang is running a liquor mafia in Tamil Nadu, and also the CBI is trying to find evidence to arrest them. At Rocky's wedding, Gnanam proposes a deal to Gandhi that he can let them produce the entire stock of the liquor in Tamil Nadu by killing off the DC, which they do so. Gnanam then meets Sathya and Gandhi and proposes that they produce all the lower quality liquor under different brands, which Sathya acts grotesquely and Gandhi admits that they killed off the collector. With all of this, Gnanam decides to cancel the license of Sooraa, but they learn that Gnanam had illicitly had a son with a woman in his old colony and use the information to blackmail Gnanam into reinstating the license of Sooraa. Gandhi leaves to a festival in which one of his gang members, Michael, invites him. 

In the middle of the festival, a stranger arrives and reveals himself to Gandhi as his son Dada. In this timeframe, Dada kills Michael and tells Gandhi that he was appointed on a special mission to get rid of the liquor mafia. However, Dada ensures Gandhi that he will not kill him, but he will kill everyone else. 

It is revealed that Gnanam wanted to appoint the team to seek revenge on the entire group. Gandhi visits Gnanam and tells him to stop the operation before it gets worse. Dada takes Anthony and kills him. Enraged, Rocky tries to find out who killed Anthony and Michael, where Gandhi is forced to reveal to Rocky that the officer that killed them both was his son and he cannot do anything about it. Hearing this, Rocky tries to convince Dada as an older brother. Dada decides to kill Rocky but is heavily injured in the process by Gandhi. 

Unable to bear Rocky's death, Gandhi decides not to reveal it to Sathya. He visits Nachi at her new home, and both reconcile and get Nachi to convince Dada, but to no avail. She then moves into Gandhi's house and lives there, but in a sudden turn of events, Dada is kidnapped by Gnanam because Gnanam learnt that Dada is Gandhi's son and that he will only release Dada if Gandhi kills Sathya. Gandhi meets Sathya, where Sathya has a video of Dada killing Rocky and he sees that Gandhi is also present in the video. Gandhi tries to explain to Sathya that Dada is his son and reveals the whole incident. An enraged Sathya does not listen and tries to get his men to kill Gandhi, but Gandhi ends up killing all of them and Sathya in the process. Gandhi leaves to a remote location and burns the car that he and Sathya first bought together. Dada arrives and picks up Gandhi, revealing that he was able to escape from Gnanam and tells that it was his entire idea and that he wanted Gandhi to kill Sathya so he sent the video footage to him. 

Enraged, Gandhi insults Dada and Nachi, to which Dada reacts grotesquely to the remarks. Later, Gandhi forms a plan and tells that Nachi was also kidnapped by Gnanam and gets Dada to visit Gnanam and kill him. It is revealed that Nachi was not kidnapped and that she is given a bhang laddu by Manickam to put her into deep sleep. Dada visits Gnanam and kills him, while on the phone with Gandhi. Gandhi reveals that he has destroyed all the liquor in his house and signed all of his wealth to an NGO that helps people recover from addiction and shut down all the factories. However, Gandhi also tells Dada that Nachi was never kidnapped, but that he used this opportunity to get Dada arrested and teach him that: in life, everything has to be balanced and there should not be an extreme of anything. With that, Gandhi tells him that he has become a Mahaan.

Cast

Production

Development 
In June 2020, Karthik Subbaraj was reported to direct a gangster film with Vikram in the lead role, which was tentatively titled Chiyaan 60. Vikram, initially greenlit the one-liner narrated by Subbaraj in 2016, while he was shooting for Iru Mugan, but he could not offer the role due to his commitments in other projects. While Karthik Subbaraj worked on Jagame Thandhiram, Vikram agreed to start the shoot with Subbaraj's script he earlier planned, with S. S. Lalit Kumar of Seven Screen Studio, which produced the actor's Cobra, agreed to fund the project. The film marked Vikram's return to gangster film-genre after Gemini (2002) and Bheemaa (2008). Lalit Kumar officially announced the project on 8 June 2020, with Vikram's son Dhruv also sharing a pivotal role in the film. Karthik Subbaraj utilised the COVID-19 lockdown period to develop the film's script and had planned to start the shoot only after the lockdown ends. It is touted to be a film based on revenge, similar to Petta. On 20 August 2021, the film's official title was unveiled as Mahaan.

Casting 

Soon after the film's announcement Anirudh Ravichander was chosen to score the music, in his second collaboration with Karthik Subbaraj after Petta (2019) and his maiden collaboration with Vikram. Shreyaas Krishna who worked with Subbaraj in Jagame Thandhiram was signed as the cinematographer and  Vivek Harshan joined the film's team as the editor, after multiple associations with Subbaraj since Jigarthanda (2014). Anirudh opted out of the project due to his busy schedule and was replaced by Subbaraj's norm composer Santhosh Narayanan.

The makers announced the principal cast and crew members on 10 March 2021 onwards, with Simran being the first member to be announced as a part of the film. On 12 March, Bobby Simha was announced as being in the cast, this being his sixth collaboration with Subbaraj. The next day, Vani Bhojan was confirmed, with her role reported to be Vikram's love interest; however her scenes did not make the final cut. Actors Sanath and Vettai Muthukumar were announced soon after. Sound designer Kunal Rajan who worked in Enthiran and Vishwaroopam was announced a part of the technical team, whilst Dinesh Subbarayan, son of prominent stunt choreographer Super Subbarayan joined the team as stunt director.

Filming 
Subbaraj fixed Kodaikanal as the principal location for the film, and planned to start the shoot in February 2021 due to Vikram's commitments to Cobra and Ponniyin Selvan. With Vikram's return to Chennai after completing the shooting schedule for Cobra in Russia, principal photography commenced on 10 March 2021. The film was set to be shot across Chennai, Goa and Kodaikanal. On 29 April 2021, despite the continuous shoot for about 50 days, the producers suspended the shooting, keeping in mind the rise in COVID-19 infections across Tamil Nadu. By then, 50% of the film's shooting was complete. In late-June 2021, it was announced that Subbaraj planned to resume shooting for the film in July, with the entire team being vaccinated before the shoot.

Filming resumed on 6 July, with a 35-day schedule being held in Kanchipuram and then another shooting schedule was planned around Chennai, Goa and Darjeeling. In mid-July 2021, the team headed to Darjeeling for the final schedule. and portions involving Vikram, Dhruv and Vani Bhojan were shot in this schedule. On 9 August, it was reported that Dhruv Vikram had wrapped shooting for his portions in the film. Four days later, on 14 August, it was reported that shooting for the film has been wrapped. In December 2021, Vikram and Dhruv had completed dubbing for their respective parts.

Music 
The film's soundtrack and score is composed by Santhosh Narayanan, with lyrics written by Vivek and Muthamil. Compositions for the soundtrack began during March 2021, where Santhosh and his music team recorded the first track, in collaboration with native folk musicians from Tamil Nadu. In April 2021, he started tracking vocals to record the film's songs. During mid-December, Dhruv had recorded vocals for one of the songs in the film, reporting to be his playback singing debut, despite recording a track in his debut film Adithya Varma (2019).

On the occasion of Ganesh Chaturthi (10 September 2021), the first single track "Soorayaatam" was unveiled by Sony Music India. Sung by V. M. Mahalingam and Narayanan providing backing vocals for the songs, Indiaglitz reviewed the track as "a brilliant blend of rustic rural tune and electronic music". The second single "Evanda Enakku Custody", a retro-based dance number, was released ahead of the Pongal festival, on 12 January 2022. The third single "Pona Povura", was released on 2 February 2022. The fourth single "Rich Rich", was released on 5 February 2022. The fifth single "Missing Me", wrote and sang by Dhruv Vikram, was released on 8 February 2022. The sixth single "Naan Naan", a tribute to Vikram, was released on 9 February 2022.

Release 
Mahaan was released on 10 February 2022 in Amazon Prime Video and the satellite rights of the film were sold to Kalaignar TV, where it was premiered on 31 August 2022 at 1:30 p.m. IST coinciding with Vinayagar Chaturthi.

Reception
Mahaan received generally positive reviews from critics and audiences.

M Suganth of The Times of India gave 3.5 out of 5 stars stating that "Thankfully, the emotional stakes keep getting higher and the actors deliver splendid performances. There is an air of casualness in Vikram, who seems to have loosened up a lot, that only shows the actor enjoying himself with a performance that is his best since Raavanan, which was way back, in 2010. Dhruv matches up to him in many of the scenes, proving that he is a chip off the old block. Simha, Muthukumar, Simran and Sananth, too, deliver memorable performances that elevate the scenes and the film. Praveen Sudevan of The Hindu after reviewing the film stated that "In its last hour or so, you find the film trying to do too many things. We follow a father-son rivalry, a story of a man paying for his sins, a battle of two ideologies… and, of course, amidst all this, we get a twist as well (because this is a Karthik Subbaraj padam). It is admirable that Mahaan attempts to juggle all this. But after a point, it gets a bit excessive. And you wonder if the film should have listened to a line from its protagonist. “Everything in moderation. That’s the right way to be." Ashameera Aiyappan of First Post who gave a rating of 2 out of 5 stated that "Karthik Subbaraj’s films have always played with irony. In Jigarthanda, he found irony in a gangster who found his calling as a comedian. Pizza had a man who was terrified of ghosts, cook up a great ghost story to cover up a theft. Iraivi was a film about female empowerment but told through the male characters. Even his short film in the anthology Navarasa looks at ‘peace’ from an ironic vantage point, an ongoing war. Mahaan is the latest addition to the list. But with its flawed set-ups and a lack of emotional depth, it doesn't become a very memorable one." Haricharan Pudipeddi of Hindustan Times stated after reviewing the film that "Mahaan extracts a very uninhibited performance from Vikram, who is refreshing in a character that spans over five decades. This is a very mature performance, and he embraces the character’s flaws and vulnerability so convincingly. Dhruv Vikram looks even more comfortable in his second outing as an actor. After leaving a strong impact with his debut film, a remake of Arjun Reddy, he delivers a slightly exaggerated performance which suits the character. Bobby Simhaa gets a meaty part and even though you find him in almost every Karthik Subbaraj film, he manages to surprise each time."

Manoj Kumar R of The Indian Express gave 3.5 out of 5 stars stating that "Composer Santhosh Narayanan’s background score, cinematographer Shreyaas Krishna’s camera enriches the mood and atmosphere of Karthik’s vision. If Karthik had slowed the pace a little and dug deep into the period and atmosphere of his characters, Mahaan could have been his own version of “Once Upon a Time in America.” But, that doesn't take away the fact that it is a spicy action-family-drama that in a way captures the moral and spiritual struggle of our time." Ranjani Krishnakumar of Film Companion stated after reviewing the film that "At two hours and forty-two minutes, Mahaan is a self-indulgent and vacuous film. At its best, it’s tiresome. At its worst, it’s an abomination." Aditya Shrikrishna of The Quint stated that "Vikram’s Gandhi transforms into ‘The Man with No Name’ in his sleep, belting out “get three coffins ready” like Clint Eastwood in A Fistful of Dollars. But after a chance meeting with a beggar on his fortieth birthday and a harsh dressing down, and a day for himself without family, he takes matters into his own hands. A curious choice from Karthik on the beggar as a major plot shifter, almost like the witches in Macbeth or the ghost in Hamlet. Mahaan doesn't shy away from its larger Shakespearean themes." Vivek of Deccan Herald gave the film’s rating 3 out of 5 and also stated that "Mahaan begins with a quote from Gandhi that says, 'Freedom is not worth having if it doesn't include the freedom to make mistakes'. Karthik's mistakes while attempting unique stories can perhaps be forgiven. But the truth remains that since Petta, the director’s craft has seen a decline.

Janani K of India Today gave 3 out of 5 stars stating that "Mahaan could have been a solid gangster drama with a conflict between a dad and son at the core. If only Karthik Subbaraj had conveyed his thoughts in a crisp screenplay, Mahaan could have been much better." Indiaglitz gave the film 2.75 out of 5 stars and stated that "Mahaan is a worthy gangster thriller to watch that marks the redemption of brilliant and natural acting from Chiyaan Vikram." Saibal Chatterjee of NDTV who gave 2 and half out of 5 stars stated that "Mahaan grabs that freedom with both hands - like the eponymous character, it makes its share of mistakes and lives to tell the tale because Vikram injects just enough variety into it with a performance that serves to temper some of the film's excesses." Bhavana Sharma of Pink Villa gave 3 out of 5 stating that "On the whole, the movie is certainly one to watch, with some thrilling action sequences to look out for." Ashwin Ram of Moviecrow gave 2.75 out of 5 stars stating that "What initially felt like an usual commercial flick turned into an emotional action drama with some intense stretches and an amusing message to finish off with. With a little more consistency in its pace and crispness in the storytelling, it could have landed solidly. Mahaan will be a Decent watch, especially for its Intent." Soumya Rajendran of The News Minute stated that "Instead of the gangster saga that it is, I wish it had been a satirical comedy on Gandhism, and a man caught in the middle of an uptight family, and his adventures without their knowledge. If only Karthik would break his rigid rule about dragging gangsters into every idea he has!"

Censorship 
In an interview after the film's release, Karthik Subburaj stated that some dialogues criticising Mahatma Gandhi's killer Nathuram Godse were censored. He stated that the line "Gandhi was killed by someone with maniacal ideological devotion, such as Godse" was asked to be removed and was told that he was free to include anything about Gandhi but not about Godse.

References

External links 
 

2020s Tamil-language films
2022 action thriller films
2022 direct-to-video films
2022 films
Films about father–son relationships
Amazon Prime Video original films
Films directed by Karthik Subbaraj
Films scored by Santhosh Narayanan
Indian direct-to-video films
Indian action thriller films